Wendell Eugene (October 12, 1923 – November 7, 2017) was an American jazz musician from New Orleans, Louisiana. He was a popular trombonist on the New Orleans jazz scene and recorded with artists such as Lionel Ferbos, Harold Dejan, and Kermit Ruffins. He was for a time the oldest active jazz musician in New Orleans.

Early life

Eugene was born to Homer and Apha Eugene on October 12, 1923, and is the youngest of five brothers. He grew up in a family of musicians including his brother Homer Eugene, his cousin Clement Tervalon, and uncle Albert Burbank. His curiosity about music began at the age of 10 when his parents bought him a graphanola.  He said he would wind it up and play The Peanut Vendor and Ramona. He received his first trombone at the age of 13 from his brother Homer after mentioning that he wanted to start playing an instrument. As a kid he learned from other New Orleans musicians, but also listened and learned from Big Band Music as well as trombonist J. J. Johnson. While still in high school, he joined the musician's union at 15 and began playing with a variety of New Orleans Jazz Legends. As a teenager, Eugene performed with Avery "Kid" Howard as well as performers and band leaders such as Papa Celestin, George Lewis, Papa French, Paul Barbarin, Louis Cottrell Jr., Willie Humphrey, Don Albert, and Kid Thomas Valentine.

Military career

Eugene joined the United States Navy during World War II and was recruited to play with the U.S. Navy Marching and Concert Band while stationed at Port Chicago, California. He played with the band throughout his four-year enlistment and also played with Louis Armstrong during a 1943 USO event. At the time, Armstrong was short a trombonist and asked Eugene to fill in. Eugene was quoted in The Times-Picayune as saying, "I got up there and did the best I could. I'll never forget it."

Music career

Eugene returned to New Orleans after his military career. He began playing with famous bands from New York City and Chicago and also toured with Lucky Millender and Buddy Johnson. Instead of leaving his family to tour, Eugene stayed close to home, working at the United States Post Office. During that time he continued playing with local band leaders such as Papa Celestin and Papa French. Eugene traveled and toured when he could, sometimes joining the Olympia Brass Band, the Tuxedo Brass Band, and the Onward Brass Band. Although limited in travel due to work obligations, Eugene was still able to sit with several renowned musical groups such as Lionel Hampton and The Temptations. He retired from the Post Office in 1979 and began to pursue his music career full-time.

Eugene is also a writer and composer. In 1978, he wrote, produced, and recorded the album West Indies Blues which was initially released by 504 Records and re-released by the Louisiana Music Factory in 2005. Eugene has played and taught music for more than 72 years, including teaching trombone and dance orchestra instruments at the Grunewald School of Music. Some of his most notable performances include playing at Super Bowl IV in New Orleans in 1970 with the Onward Brass Band. He also played at the first New Orleans Jazz & Heritage Festival in 1970. In 2012 he played with the Preservation Hall Jazz Band for their 50th anniversary performance at the New Orleans Jazz & Heritage Festival, He also played at 2012 New Orleans Jazz Festival with then 100-year-old Lionel Ferbos.

Wendell Eugene died on 7 November 2017.

Discography

Personal life

Eugene has four daughters, one grandchild, and three great grandchildren.

References

External links

 Wendell Eugene album credits at AllMusic.com

1923 births
2017 deaths
American jazz trombonists
Male trombonists
Jazz musicians from New Orleans
American male jazz musicians
Olympia Brass Band members